Yussef Abdallah Diab (1917 – 18 February 1984) was an Israeli Arab politician who served as a member of the Knesset for Cooperation and Brotherhood between 1959 and 1961.

Biography
Born in Tamra in 1917, Diab was elected to the Knesset on the Cooperation and Brotherhood list in 1959. Although the party retained its two-seat strength in the 1961 elections, both Diab and Labib Hussein Abu Rokan lost their seats.

He died in 1984.

External links
 

1917 births
1984 deaths
Arab members of the Knesset
Cooperation and Brotherhood politicians
Members of the 4th Knesset (1959–1961)
People from Tamra